Huang Chih-peng is a Taiwanese politician who received a bachelor's degree from National Chengchi University, with a major in Public Finance. He is the former Administrator of International Affairs in the Ministry of Economic Affairs

References

 Taipei Economic and Cultural Office, Hanoi, Vietnam

1951 births
Living people
Politicians of Taiwan
National Chengchi University alumni